Ralph Bruce Fitch is a Canadian politician, He represents Riverview in the Legislative Assembly of New Brunswick.

Early life
Born in Moncton, New Brunswick, he is the son of Dr. Ralph Fitch. In 1980, he graduated with a Bachelor of Science degree in Biology from Mount Allison University. His career in the private sector was in the insurance and financial industries. He worked with Scotiabank and its brokerage firm ScotiaMcLeod for many years prior to his election to the legislature.

Political career
He was first involved in politics when he was elected in 1989 to the municipal council of the Town of Riverview. He was re-elected to that position in 1992 and 1995 before successfully running for mayor in 1998. He was re-elected mayor in 2001 and served in that capacity until his election to the legislature in the 2003 provincial election. Fitch was the only non-incumbent Progressive Conservative to win a seat in that election and was immediately named to cabinet as Minister of Energy.  He was shuffled to the new Justice and Consumer Affairs portfolio on February 14, 2006 despite having no legal training; this was made possible by disassociating the functions of the Office of the Attorney General from the Justice Department.

He is a member of the First Baptist Church. His hobbies include sailboarding and golf. An ardent fan and supporter of minor sports, he is frequently seen on the sidelines of his children’s games. He also coached minor soccer and football in the past.

He has been involved in the community for many years. He has been a member of many boards and committees, including Codiac Regional Police Board, Lakeview Manor Senior Citizens Home, and the Atlantic Baptist University.

On October 18, 2014 after the Progressive Conservative Party under David Alward failed to form government, Fitch was made interim leader of the Progressive Conservative Party and Leader of the Opposition of New Brunswick.

Fitch was re-elected in the 2018 and 2020 provincial elections.

References

External links
 MLA Bios, Government of New Brunswick

Progressive Conservative Party of New Brunswick MLAs
Year of birth missing (living people)
Living people
People from Moncton
21st-century Canadian politicians
Leaders of the Progressive Conservative Party of New Brunswick
Members of the Executive Council of New Brunswick